Charles Chauncey Dwight was a justice of the New York State Supreme Court. Through his sister, Mary, he was the brother-in-law of Edward Huntting Rudd.

He owned the Charles Chauncey Dwight House.

References

New York Supreme Court Justices 
People from Auburn, New York